Shabash Professor Shonku (Bravo Professor Shonku) is a Professor Shonku series book written by Satyajit Ray  and published by Ananda Publishers in 1974. Ray wrote the stories about Professor Shanku in Bengali magazines Sandesh and Anandamela. This book is a collection of seven Shonku stories.

Stories
 Ashcharya Pranee (Sandesh, Autumn 1971),
 Swapnadweep (Sandesh, May and June 1971),
 Moru Rahasya (Sandesh, May and June 1972),
 Corvus (Anandamela, Autumn 1972),
 Dr. Sering er Smaramsakti (Anandamela, Autumn 1974)

See also
Selam Professor Shonku
Punashcha Professor Shonku
Professor Shonkur Kandokarkhana

References

Science fiction short stories
1974 short story collections
Bengali-language literature
Professor Shonku short stories